Adams River may refer to:
Adams River (British Columbia), Canada, a river in south-central British Columbia
Adams River (New Zealand)
Adams River (Tasmania), Australia, a tributary of Gordon River

See also
Adams (disambiguation)